Sage Hill is a residential neighbourhood in the northwest quadrant of Calgary, Alberta, Canada. Located near the north edge of the city, it is bounded by the Nolan Hill community across Shaganappi Trail to the west, 144 Avenue N.W. to the north, the Evanston community to the east, and the Kincora community across 128 Avenue N.W. to the south. It is one of five communities located within the Symons Valley area. West Nose Creek flows through the eastern portion of the community.

Sage Hill is located within Calgary City Council's Ward 2.

Demographics 

See also 
List of neighbourhoods in Calgary

References 

Neighbourhoods in Calgary